The following is a list of people from Lycoming County, Pennsylvania.  Inclusion on the list should be reserved for notable people past and present who have resided in the county, either in cities or rural areas.

Arts and film
 Ernest Callenbach (1929–2012), film critic and author
 Newt Heisley (1920–2009), artist
 Frances Tipton Hunter (1896–1957), illustrator
 Severin Roesen (1816 – after 1872), artist
 Tom Woodruff Jr. (born 1959), actor

Athletes

 Butch Alberts (born 1950), MLB pitcher
 Blaise Alexander (1976–2001), NASCAR driver
 Casper Asbjornson (1909–1970), MLB catcher 
 Dominick Bragalone (born 1996), college football player
 Gary Brown (born 1969), former NFL running back
 Pat Daneker (born 1976), former MLB pitcher 
 D. J. Flick (born 1980), CFL player
 Larry Kelley (1915–2000), Heisman trophy winner
 Alize Johnson (born 1996), NBA player
 Kelly Mazzante (born 1982), WNBA player
 Mike Mussina (born 1968), former MLB All-Star pitcher 
 C. W. Smith (1947–2017), NASCAR driver
 Chevon Troutman (born 1981), professional basketball player
 Weldon Wyckoff (1892–1961), MLB pitcher

Businesspeople
 Henry J. Lutcher (1836–1912), business partner of the Lutcher and Moore Lumber Company
 Richard M. Ramin (1929–1995), Vice President for Public Affairs at Cornell University
 William Schreyer (1928–2011), former CEO of Merrill Lynch & Co.

Educators
 Julia C. Collins (c.1842–1865), African-American schoolteacher
 Robert E. Streeter (1916–2002), academic and educator
 Martha Dewing Woodward (1856–1950), art teacher

Law
 Lawrence Lessig (born 1961), attorney and political activist
 Richard Ziman (born 1942), attorney

Military
 Albert Ralph Campbell (1874–1925), U.S. Marine

Musicians 

 Dylan Rockoff (born 1994), singer-songwriter

Politics

 William Hepburn Armstrong (1824–1919), member of the U.S. House of Representatives from Pennsylvania.
 Harris Jacob Bixler (1870–1941), member of the U.S. House of Representatives
 James Hepburn Campbell (1820–1895), member of the U.S. House of Representatives
 Alexander Cummings (1810–1867), third Governor of the Territory of Colorado
 Elias Deemer (1838–1918), member of the U.S. House of Representatives
 Thomas W. Dempsey (born 1931), member of the Pennsylvania House of Representatives
 Robert W. Edgar (1943–2013), member of the U.S. House of Representatives
 William Cox Ellis (1787–1871), member of the U.S. House of Representatives
 Edgar Raymond Kiess (1875–1930), member of the U.S. House of Representatives
 Eugene Yaw (born 1943), Pennsylvania state senator

Science
 Cuthbert Daniel (1904–1997), scientist and industrial statistician
 Michael Roskin (born 1939), scientist
 Edgar Nelson Transeau (1857–1960), botanist and phycologist, president of the Botanical Society of America and the Ecological Society of America

Writers
 Juliet H. Lewis Campbell (1823–1898), poet and author
 William Clifford Heilman (1877–1946), poet and composer
Adam Makos (born 1981), author and historian
 Frank Young (1884–1957), sportswriter

Other

 William Perry Eveland (1864–1916), Missionary Bishop
 Daniel Hughes (1804–1880), conductor, agent and station master in the Underground Railroad
 Carl Stotz (1910–1992), founder of Little League
 George Valiantine (1847–1947), medium

See also 

 List of people from Pennsylvania

References

 
Lycoming